"Sound of Kuduro" is a kuduro song by Buraka Som Sistema featuring DJ Znobia, M.I.A., Saborosa and Puto Prata, from their album Black Diamond released in 2008. The song was recorded in Angola, and a video for the song was recorded in 2007. "Sound of Kuduro" also appeared on the special edition of M.I.A.'s Kala. Pitchfork Media placed the song at number 97 on their best tracks of 2008 list.

Music video
The video for the song was recorded in Angola in 2007, and features footage of the vocalists recording for the song around the country, travelling around the city, joining street and yard parties and local dancers. The video was posted onto YouTube in March 2008, receiving attention across the blogosphere.

References

External links
 Sound Of Kuduro video
 700 KUDURO VIDEOS KUDUROPEDIA  

2008 singles
Buraka Som Sistema songs
M.I.A. (rapper) songs
Songs written by M.I.A. (rapper)
2008 songs
Sony BMG singles